The name Teatro comunale is an Italian term for a theater house, or opera house.  Many towns in Italy have a Teatro Comunale.

Notable opera houses known as Teatro Comunale include:
 Teatro Comunale Vittorio Emanuele, Benevento
 Teatro Comunale di Bologna
 Teatro Comunale di Chiaravalle, Chiaravalle, Marche
 Teatro Comunale di Cosenza, Cosenza
 Teatro Comunale Ferrara
 Teatro Comunale Florence
 , L'Aquila
 Teatro Comunale San Gallo, Loreto, Marche
 Teatro Comunale Modena
 Teatro Comunale di Montecarotto, Montecarotto
 Teatro Comunale Alighieri, Ravenna
 Teatro Comunale Cilea di Reggio Calabria, Reggio Calabria
 Teatro Comunale Santa Maria del Mercato, Serra San Quirico
 Teatro Comunale Giuseppe Verdi, Trieste
 Teatro Comunale di Vicenza

See also
 Teatro alla Scala (La Scala), Milan, Italy
 Teatro Municipal (disambiguation)
 List of opera houses, a worldwide list